WBOG (1460 AM) is a radio station broadcasting a classic-based country music format. It is licensed to Tomah, Wisconsin, United States, and is owned by Magnum Radio. The station features programming from Westwood One.

2011 name change

In May 2011, WBOG's slogan was changed to "Kool Gold 1460", using the branding of the Kool Gold satellite service heard on WBOG. On January 7, 2020, the station flipped formats to classic country.

References

External links

Classic country radio stations in the United States
BOG
1959 establishments in Wisconsin
BOG
Radio stations established in 1959